George Mills may refer to:

George Mills (footballer) (1908–1970), English footballer
George Mills (RAF officer) (1902–1971), British Air Chief Marshal
George Mills (novel), a 1982 novel by American author Stanley Elkin
George Mills (cricketer, born 1793) (1793–1865), English cricketer
George Mills (cricketer, born 1867) (1867–1942), New Zealand cricketer
George Mills (cricketer, born 1916) (1916–1979), New Zealand cricketer
George Mills (cricketer, born 1923) (1923–1983), English cricketer
George Hamilton Mills (1827–1901), mayor of Hamilton, Ontario
George Pilkington Mills (1867–1945), English racing cyclist
George Mills (politician) (1876–1948), Member of the Legislative Assembly of Alberta, 1920–1926
George Mills (writer) (1896–1972), children's author and schoolmaster
George D. Mills (1898–1948), American lawyer and politician
George S. Mills (1866–?), American architect
George William Mills (1876–1933), British politician
George Mills (artist) (1792–1824), British sculptor, engraver and medallist
George Mills (shipbuilder) (1808–1881), Scottish shipbuilder, journalist and novelist
George Mills (athlete) (born 1999), British champion athlete

Mills, George